John Mathieson may refer to:

John Mathieson (surveyor) (1855–1945), Scottish explorer and surveyor
John Alexander Mathieson (1863–1947), Premier of the Canadian province of Prince Edward Island, 1911–1917
John Mathieson (computer scientist), computer scientist
John Mathieson (cinematographer) (born 1958), British cinematographer
John Mathieson (minister), Church of Scotland minister

See also
John Matheson (born 1917), Canadian politician
John Mathison (1901–1982), New Zealand politician